Éire Óg are a GAA club based in Carlow town. The club are solely involved in the sport of gaelic football, fielding teams across all underage categories as well as adult competitions. Formed in 1958, the club has enjoyed tremendous success on the field and are one of the most successful clubs in the history of Carlow GAA. They have won the Carlow Senior Football Championship 30 times, the Leinster Senior Club Football Championship 5 times and were All-Ireland Senior Club Football Championship runners up in 1993 and 1996.

History

Honours

 Carlow Senior Football Championship 30: 1960, 1962, 1965, 1967, 1968, 1969, 1974, 1976, 1977, 1978, 1980, 1982, 1984, 1987, 1988, 1989, 1992, 1993, 1994, 1995, 1996, 1998, 2005, 2007, 2008, 2012 2017, 2018, 2019, 2020
 Leinster Senior Club Football Championship 5: 1992-93, 1993–94, 1995–96, 1996–97, 1998–99
 '''All-Ireland Senior Club Football Championship Runners up: 1993, 1996

Notable players

 Vinny Harvey
 Leo Turley
 Garvan Ware

References

External sources

Gaelic games clubs in County Carlow